China is the tenth studio album by the South African rock band The Parlotones. It was released July 2018 initially as a double album in South Africa under Gallo Record Company and in 2019 as a single disc both in the United States under Ok!Good Records and in Europe under Butler Records. The album received the nomination for "Best Rock Album" from the 25th South African Music Awards.

It is the first album to feature keyboardist Rob Davidson, who was previously a touring member for the group.

Track listing

Personnel
Personnel data taken from Ok!Good Records' Bandcamp.
 Kahn Morbee – vocals, guitar
 Neil Pauw – drums
 Glen Hodgson – bass, keyboards, backing vocals
 Paul Hodgson – lead guitar
 Rob Davidson – keyboards
 John Mayer – strings
 Rebecca Taylor – vocals
 Jacques Du Plessis – producer, recorder, mixer
 Adrian Erasmus – assistant producer
 Gavin Flaks – assistant producer

References

2018 albums
The Parlotones albums